Desborough railway station was built by the Midland Railway on its extension from Leicester to Bedford and Hitchin.

History

The station opened on 8 May 1857 as Desborough. It was renamed on 1 October the same year as Desborough for Rothwell.

On 20 May 1899, Elizabeth Palmer and her five-year-old child, Dixon Palmer, were hit by a fish train whilst crossing the line at the station to get to the opposite platform and killed instantly.  By August 1899 the Midland Railway Company had received instructions from the Board of Trade to erect a footbridge over the line.

In response to a requisition from the ratepayers of Rothwell, the Midland Railway Company decided to inaugurate a bus service between Rothwell and Desborough station in 1899. The station was renamed Desborough and Rothwell on 17 October 1899.

The station closed in 1968. The station building still stands but the goods yard area is now built-over, mainly given over to a Co-op Food store and its car park. The remainder of the area is occupied by Albany Sheds.

Stationmasters

Samuel Buxton ca. 1858 - 1862 (afterwards station master at Hassop)
G. Rawlings from 1862 (formerly station master at Wigston)
Thomas Gadsby ca. 1870 - 1899 
William Samuel Orchard 1899 - 1908 (afterwards station master at Clay Cross)
Percy R. Handscomb 1908 - 1928
C.G. Tompkins from 1928  (formerly station master at Weedon)
Alfred Jones 1941  - 1947 (formerly station master at Mostyn, afterwards station master at Lichfield City)
Cyril Breeze ca. 1963

References

Further reading

Disused railway stations in Northamptonshire
Beeching closures in England
Railway stations in Great Britain opened in 1857
Railway stations in Great Britain closed in 1968
Former Midland Railway stations
Charles Henry Driver railway stations
1857 establishments in England
Desborough